This list contains all present and former municipalities in the Dutch province of Utrecht since 1812, when it was first divided into municipalities (gemeenten). Before then, it consisted of 5 cities and about 140 manors (see list of manors in Utrecht). Since 2011, Utrecht has had 26 municipalities.

See also 
 List of settlements in Utrecht

References 

 W.A.G. Perks, Geschiedenis van de gemeentegrenzen in de provincie Utrecht van 1795 tot 1940 ("History of the municipal boundaries in the province Utrecht from 1795 to 1940"), Provinciale Almanak, 1962
 Statistics Netherlands, https://www.cbs.nl
 

Utrecht
Geography of Utrecht (province)
 
 
Municipalities, Utrecht